Njarðvík is a town in southwestern Iceland, on the peninsula of Reykjanes. As of 2009, its population was 4,400.

History
In 1995 it merged with the town of Keflavík and the village of Hafnir to form the new municipality of Reykjanesbær. The area is mentioned in the Icelandic Sagas, Njarðvík means "bay of Njörðr".

Geography
Njarðvík is located in the Reykjanes region of Reykjavík, adjacent to Keflavík. It consists of two parts: Innri Njarðvík  and Ytri Njarðvík  (inner and outer Njarðvík). In the old town is the Njarðvíkurkirkja Innri , a stone church built in 1886.

Climate

See also
Viking World museum
Ungmennafélag Njarðvíkur

Notes and references

External links

 Reykjanesbær municipal website

Populated places in Southern Peninsula (Iceland)
Reykjanes
Keflavík